Full Confession is a 1939 is a US proto film-noir, crime drama film made by RKO Radio Pictures. It was directed by  John Farrow from an adaptation by Jerome Cady of Leo Birinski's story. The film stars Victor McLaglen, Sally Eilers, Barry Fitzgerald and Joseph Calleia.

Plot
Pat McGinnis (Victor McLaglen) murders a policeman and escapes by committing a more minor crime, for which he is arrested and jailed. An innocent man, Michael O'Keefe (Barry Fitzgerald), is convicted of the murder and sentenced to death. While delirious after an injury, McGinnis confesses to priest Father Loma (Joseph Calleia). Loma, whose flock includes McGinnis's girlfriend Molly Sullivan (Sally Eilers) as well as the O'Keefe clan, struggles to find a way to save O'Keefe without violating the sanctity of confession. He must convince McGinnis to give himself up.

Cast
 Victor McLaglen as Pat McGinnis
 Sally Eilers as Molly Sullivan
 Joseph Calleia as Father Loma
 Barry Fitzgerald as Michael O'Keefe
 Elisabeth Risdon as Norah O'Keefe
 Pamela Blake as Laura Mahoney (as Adele Pearce)
 Malcolm 'Bud' McTaggart as Frank O'Keefe
 John Bleifer as Weaver
 William Haade as Moore
 George Humbert as Mercantonio

Production
Pandro S. Berman of RKO bought the film rights to Leo Birinski's story in January 1939 intending to turn it into a vehicle for Chester Morris. Robert Sisk was assigned to produce.

Eventually the lead role was given to Victor McLaglen and John Farrow was given the job of directing. A key support part was given to Barry Fitzgerald, who had appeared in The Informer (1935) with McLaglen and had not made a film since Bringing Up Baby (1938); he had most recently been on Broadway in The White Steed.

Lucille Ball was to play the female lead but was ultimately unable to because she was recovering from an operation for appendicitis. Filming started 15 June 1939.

Notes
Full Confession is often regarded as a semi-remake of John Ford's The Informer (1935) starring the same leading man, Victor McLaglen.

References

External links
 
 
 
 
Review of film at New York Times

1939 films
American crime drama films
American black-and-white films
1939 crime drama films
Films scored by Roy Webb
Films directed by John Farrow
RKO Pictures films
1930s English-language films
1930s American films